KQCL (95.9 FM, "Classic Rock Power 96") is a radio station broadcasting a classic rock music format. Licensed to Faribault, Minnesota, United States, the station is currently owned by Townsquare Media.

History
The station was assigned the call sign KDHL-FM on January 10, 1968. On September 1, 1987, the station changed its call sign to KOFN, and on November 1, 1988, to the current KQCL.

On August 30, 2013, a deal was announced in which Townsquare Media would acquire 53 Cumulus stations, including KQCL, for $238 million. The deal was part of Cumulus' acquisition of Dial Global; Townsquare and Dial Global were both controlled by Oaktree Capital Management. The sale to Townsquare was completed on November 14, 2013.

References

External links

Radio stations in Minnesota
Classic rock radio stations in the United States
Radio stations established in 1968
1968 establishments in Minnesota
Townsquare Media radio stations